R-2000 is a Natural Resources Canada (NRCan) program that was developed in partnership with the Canadian Home Builders' Association in 1981, and formalized as a standard in 1982.  Notably, the R-2000 standard is a voluntary standard to exceed building code requirements for energy efficiency, indoor air quality, and environmental responsibility.

The R-2000 program is managed by NRCan's Office of Energy Efficiency and comprises:
 R-2000 standard - technical specifications
 quality assurance
 certification
 training and licensing of builders and service providers
 consumer information

In May 2008, the CHBA published an internal discussion paper proposing changes to the R-2000 standard so it would remain at the forefront as the reference model that influences other programs or initiatives.

See also
 Canada Green Building Council
 EnerGuide
 Energy Star for New Homes

References

External links
 NRCan Office of Energy Efficiency: About R-2000
 Canadian Home Builders' Association R-2000 website (archive.org, 2008) 
Canadian Home Builders' Association - Net Zero Program

Environment of Canada
Construction industry of Canada
Real estate in Canada
Sustainable building in Canada